William Boner may refer to:

 Bill Boner (born 1945), former mayor of Nashville, Tennessee
 William H. Boner (1863–1925), Washington state businessman and politician